Klubi i Basketbollit Peja (English: Basketball Club Peja) is a Kosovar professional basketball club based in Pejë. The club currently plays in the Kosovo Basketball Superleague.

KB Peja has won 6 National Championships, 4 Kosovo Basketball Cups and 2 Kosovo Supercups. The team's roster has included big names like Acie Earl, Fred House, Ricardo Marsh, Samir Shaptahu, Dardan Berisha, and Gerti Shima.

History
The team was officially formed on 13 March 1993 under the ownership of Ilhami Gashi. The club's first manager was Valdet Spahija and the first roster consisted of Valdet Spahija (as player-manager), Riza Gjakova, Ahmet Nimani, Besim Gjuka, Sebajdin Sylejmani, Agim Lluka, Agim Beqiraj and Turhan Zajmi.

The team name was KB Peja until 2001, when Ekrem Lluka bought the club and renamed it KB Dukagjini(Dukagjini is the company named after the region). In 2005 the name was changed back to KB Peja.
In the 1996-97 season KB Peja played in the second division, due to problems with the Basketball Federation of Kosovo. In 2003-04, the team didn't compete in any league organized by the Basketball Federation of Kosovo.

In the 2016–17 season, Peja would play in a European competition for the first time, when the team entered the FIBA Europe Cup.

Honours and titles

Domestic
Kosovo Superleague 
Winners (6): 1993, 1994, 1995, 1996, 2004, 2013
Runners-up (8): 2000, 2005, 2008, 2011, 2014, 2015, 2016, 2021
Kosovo Cup 
Winners (6): 1994, 1995, 1997, 2011, 2015, 2020
Runners-up (7): 2001, 2006, 2008, 2009, 2013, 2016, 2017
Kosovo Supercup
Winners (2): 1997, 2015
Balkan International Basketball League
Semi-finalist (2): 2015, 2017
Liga Unike
Winners (1): 2022
Runners-up (1): 2021

Players

Current roster

Depth chart

Notable players

Kosovo and Albania
 Dardan Berisha
 Edis Kuraja
 Ersid Ljuca
 Gerti Shima
 Malcolm Armstead
 Samir Shaptahu
 Valdet Grapci
 Valdet Spahija

Balkans
 Adnan Bajramović
 Dragan Pusić
 Goran Kalamiža
 Hrvoje Puljko
 Jan Močnik
 Jozo Brkić
 Mirza Ahmetbašić
 Nedžad Spahić
 Teo Simović

United States
 Acie Earl
 Anthony Knox
 Cyril Awere
 Dustin Scott
 Fred House
 George Odufuwa
 Janou Rubin
 Mario Austin
 Mario Edwards
 Nic Wise
 Ricardo Marsh
 Theo Little

Other countries
 Carlos Morban
 Harouna Mutombo

Coaching history 

         Valdet Spahija
 2006/07  Robert Matijević
 2007 - 2011  Bujar Loci
 2011/12  Ivica Marić
 2012/13  Rudolf Jugo
 2013/14  Danijel Lutz
 2013/14  Boban Savović
 2014/15  Borislav Kurtović
 2015–2016  Branimir Pavić
 2016–2017  Aleksandar Todorov
 2019–2020 Jeronimo Šarin
 2020 Adis Bečiragić
 2020 Şemsettin Baş
 2021 Edi Dželalija
 2021 Jordančo Davitkov
 2021 Dragan Radović
 2021-2022 Şemsettin Baş
 2022–present Marin Dokuzovski

References

External links
Official website
Eurobasket.com Team Profile

Basketball teams in Kosovo
Sport in Peja